The Governor of Stirling Castle was the military officer who commanded Stirling Castle, in Scotland. Control of the castle frequently passed between the Scots and the English during the Wars of Scottish Independence. The castle's military character was maintained for several centuries, the last siege occurring in 1746 during the Jacobite risings. It continued to be used as a military barracks until 1964.

Governors of Stirling Castle

1715–1716: Sir James Campbell, 2nd Baronet
1716–1722: John Hamilton-Leslie, 9th Earl of Rothes
1722–1741: John Leslie, 10th Earl of Rothes
1741–1763: John Campbell, 4th Earl of Loudoun
1763: Isaac Barré
1763–1788: Sir James Campbell, 3rd Baronet
1788–1789: Hon. Alexander Mackay
1789–1806: James Grant
1806–1832: John Hely-Hutchinson, 2nd Earl of Donoughmore
1832–1846?: Sir Martin Hunter

Deputy Governors of Stirling Castle
 1717–1729: Colonel John Blackadder (1664-1729);
 bef. 1739–1781: James Abercrombie
 1781–1796: Thomas Musgrave
 1796–1800: William Goodday Strutt
 1800–1831: Samuel Graham
 1831–1847: Colonel Archibald Christie

References

History of Stirling (council area)
Stirling